Edwin Graf Rothkirch und Trach (1 November 1888 - 29 July 1980) born in Militsch,  was a German general during World War II who commanded Army Group Centre Rear Area and later an army corps. As a show jumper, he took part in the 1932 Summer Olympics in Los Angeles.

Career
Rothkirch und Trach commanded Army Group Centre Rear Area starting in 1943. Between 18 April and 27 October 1944, he was Wehrmachtbefehlshaber Weißruthenien (Military commander in Belarus). In November 1944, he was appointed to command the LIII Army Corps. On 6 March 1945 Rothkirch, still commanding officer of LIII Corps, wandered into U.S. lines and was taken prisoner west of Coblenz, Germany. He was interned at Trent Park, an English prison camp in North London for high-ranking German officers.

Knowledge of the Holocaust
While stationed in General Government, Rothkirch und Trach became aware of mass shootings by the SS (Schutzstaffel). In its review of Soldaten ("Soldiers") by historian Sönke Neitzel and social psychologist Harald Welzer (a book based on secret recordings of German POWs by the Allied intelligence), Der Spiegel reports:
"Many Wehrmacht soldiers became witnesses to the Holocaust because they happened to be present or were invited to take part in a mass shooting. In one cell conversation, army General Edwin Graf von Rothkirch und Trach talks about his time in the General Government town of Kutno:

"I knew an SS leader pretty well, and we talked about this and that, and one day he said: 'Listen, if you ever want to film one of these shootings? …I mean, it doesn't really matter. These people are always shot in the morning. If you're interested, we still have a few left over, and we could also shoot them in the afternoon if you like."

It takes some sense of routine to be able to make such an offer. The fact that the people involved did not try to keep their activities a secret demonstrates how much the perpetrators took for granted the "mass shootings of Jews," as one of the POWs in Trent Park called it."

Rothkirch und Trach died in 1980.

References

Citations

Bibliography

1888 births
1980 deaths
People from Milicz
People from the Province of Silesia
Prussian nobility
German Army generals of World War II
Generals of Cavalry (Wehrmacht)
Recipients of the Gold German Cross
Officers Crosses of the Order of Merit of the Federal Republic of Germany